The São Bernardo River is a river of Goiás state and the Federal District in central Brazil. It is a tributary of the Preto River.

References
Brazilian Ministry of Transport

See also
List of rivers of Goiás

Rivers of Federal District (Brazil)
Rivers of Goiás